Bexhill Museum is in Bexhill-on-Sea, East Sussex. An independent museum founded in 1914. The museum is run as a registered charity supported by volunteers and two employees.

History
Bexhill Museum was opened in 1914. The Reverend J.C. Thompson FGS and Kate Marsden FRGS were instrumental in the setting up of the museum and Thompson was Hon Curator until 1924. Marsden was one of the first women to be made a fellow of the Royal Geographical Society after she travelled thousands of miles across Russia to Siberia in 1891. Marsden is credited as the person who inspired the museum's creation as she organised meetings to gather local support. She invited local dignitaries and successfully applied for artefacts from Bryant and May, Frys and Colmans.
The museum was given a shell collection by Marsden and she encouraged Dr Walter Amsden to donate a collection of Egyptian artefacts. In 1913 the Mayor of Bexhill contacted the committee and revealed that Marsden had been involved in a controversy concerning her finances and sexuality. Marsden was obliged to resign.

The museum is housed in what was known as the Egerton Park Shelter Hall, built in 1903 by George Ball. This had been a small entertainments pavilion for the use of visitors to the park. The Bexhill Corporation owned the building and leased it to the museum as well as proving a small grant.

Henry Sargent started work at Bexhill Museum in 1920 and remained in post until his death in 1983. The museum's governing body, the Bexhill Museum Association, was founded in 1923.

The museum built up a collection of local archaeology and taxidermy and founded the Bexhill Museum Association in 1923 to oversee their work. The natural history collection was not well preserved as the temperature and light levels were difficult to control and the basement was liable to flood.

In 1986 the museum's buildings were remodelled. The lighting and heating were brought under better control and temporary exhibition space and a store were established in the previous toilet blocks. Over the next ten years the relationship with Rother District Council led to a curator being transferred to the museum.

Today
The museum merged with the Bexhill Museum of Costume in 2004 and became a registered charity overseen by trustees. It is run by volunteers, with two paid employees and a curator employed by Rother District Council. The patron of the museum is Eddie Izzard.

A Second World War exhibition and model rail layout should be completed in time for the 80th commemoration of the outbreak of World War II.

References

1914 establishments in England
Museums established in 1914
Museums in East Sussex
Bexhill-on-Sea
Local museums in East Sussex